LRHS may refer to:

Canada:
 Laurentian Regional High School, in Lachute, Quebec
 Liverpool Regional High School, in Liverpool, Nova Scotia
 Lockeport Regional High School, in Lockeport, Nova Scotia

United States:
 La Reine High School, in Suitland, Prince George's County, Maryland, 
 Lakeland Regional High School, in Passaic County, New Jersey
 Lake Ridge High School, in Mansfield, Texas
 Lakewood Ranch High School, in Bradenton, Florida
 Leesville Road High School, in Raleigh, North Carolina
 Lenape Regional High School, in Medford, New Jersey
 Loch Raven High School, in Towson, Maryland
 Logan-Rogersville High School, in Rogersville, Missouri
 Long Reach High School, in Columbia, Maryland